Bani Saba' is a sub-district located in Al Qafr District, Ibb Governorate, Yemen. Bani Saba' had a population of  7781 as of 2004.

References 

Sub-districts in Al Qafr District